The Florida dry prairie is a herbaceous upland plant community found in subtropical southern Florida. It consists of plains covered in grasses, low shrubs, and few widely scattered trees. It was originally found on the plains near the Kissimmee River and Fisheating Creek connected to Lake Okeechobee, but conversion to agriculture and pasture have reduced its range. Frequent fires are necessary to maintain this system.

Geographic range 

Dry prairie was once the dominant grassland endemic to central Florida, from the western shore of Lake Okeechobee and extending northeast into Osceola County. Historically, it is thought that Florida’s dry prairie covered approximately 1,931 square miles. Pre-settlement dry prairie could be separated into three regions: the “Kissimmee River Prairie,” “the Big Prairie” across central Florida, and the “Myakka Prairie”. These three regions are not geographically isolated.

Flora and fauna 

There are 658 known vascular flora species, 115 families, and 317 genera found in Florida’s dry prairie, with 94% of species native to central Florida. There are no plants known to be endemic to the dry prairie environment, but there are a number of species endemic to the Florida peninsula. The shrub layer is dominated by saw palmetto (Serenoa repens). Occasional trees include slash pine (Pinus elliottii) and cabbage palm (Sabal palmetto). Wiregrass (Aristidia beyrichiana), toothache grass (Ctenium aromaticum), and beak rush (Rhynchospora spp.) are dominant grasses and sedges. Where slash pine is more abundant, this system grades into south Florida pine flatwoods.

There are a number of species that are listed as “at-risk” that can be found in the Florida dry prairie. The grasshopper sparrow (Ammodramus savannarum floridanus), sandhill crane (Antigone canadensis pratensis), burrowing owl (Athene cunicularia floidana), and the Florida panther (Puma concolor coryi) are a few that are at risk, with the grasshopper sparrow and panther listed as “endangered” according to the U.S. Endangered Species Act.

Human influence

Agriculture 
The increased settlement and growing population of Florida in the early 20th century came with expanded agriculture and the conversion of dry prairie to farmland. Extensive dairy and citrus farms have very little dry prairie vegetation and result in landscape fragmentation, subsequently reducing habitat for dry prairie wildlife. There may also exist a correlation between wetland development and encroachment of the pineland/prairie border.

Fire suppression 
Historically, this system experienced fire intervals of 1-4 years, allowing fire-adapting vegetation to grow and maintaining the treeless landscape. Many vegetative species are found in greater abundance at sites with frequent fire . As the settlement of Florida expanded, fire suppression became common practice to prevent damage to homes and agriculture. Because the dry prairie system requires fire for maintenance, suppression has reduced the geographic coverage of this system. With regular prescribed burning, a resurgence in dry prairie vegetation and wildlife can be seen.

References

Plant communities of Florida
Ecoregions of Florida
Flora of Florida